Khan Duz-e Sadat (also Romanized as Khān Dūz-e Sādāt and Khāndūz Sādāt; also known as Khān Dūz) is a village in Khormarud-e Shomali Rural District, in the Central District of Azadshahr County, Golestan Province, Iran. At the 2006 census, its population was 1,147, in 266 families.

References 

Populated places in Azadshahr County